Sociedade Esportiva Decisão Futebol Clube, commonly known as Decisão, is a Brazilian football club based in Bonito, Pernambuco. They compete in the Campeonato Pernambucano.

Squad

Achievements
 Campeonato Pernambucano A2:
 Winners (1): 2019
 Runners up (1): 2017

 Copa Pernambuco:
 Runners up (1): 2001

References

Association football clubs established in 1996
1996 establishments in Brazil